Juan Luis Martínez Martínez (born 26 June 1972) is a Mexican politician affiliated with the National Regeneration Movement (formerly to the Citizens' Movement. He currently serves as Deputy of the LXII Legislature of the Mexican Congress representing Oaxaca.

References

1972 births
Living people
People from Oaxaca
Citizens' Movement (Mexico) politicians
Morena (political party) politicians
21st-century Mexican politicians
Deputies of the LXII Legislature of Mexico
Members of the Chamber of Deputies (Mexico) for Oaxaca